XXX (Howitzer) Brigade, Royal Field Artillery was a brigade of the Royal Field Artillery which served in the First World War.

It was originally formed with 128th, 129th and 130th (Howitzer) Batteries, each equipped with 4.5" howitzers, and attached to 3rd Infantry Division. In August 1914, it mobilised and was sent to the Continent with the British Expeditionary Force, where it saw service with 3rd Division until broken up.

In May 1916, the artillery brigades of infantry divisions were reorganised; the pure howitzer brigades were disbanded, and their batteries attached individually to field brigades, in order to produce mixed brigades of three field batteries and one howitzer battery. Accordingly, the brigade was broken up and the batteries dispersed; 128th to 29th Brigade, 129th to 42nd Brigade, and 130th to 40th Brigade.

Notes

External links
Royal Field Artillery Brigades
3rd Division Order of Battle

References

Royal Field Artillery brigades
Artillery units and formations of World War I